Tivoli Theater was a historic theatre building located at Mishawaka, St. Joseph County, Indiana. It was built in 1924–1925, and was a two-story, brick building with a facade featuring terra cotta ornamentation, a massive central arched window, and decorative art glass. The auditorium seated 1,500 patrons. The building consisted of three storefronts and the auditorium and lobby entrance, and office on the second floor.  It was demolished on February 2, 2005.

It was listed on the National Register of Historic Places in 1998, and delisted in 2005.

References

External links 
 

Former National Register of Historic Places in Indiana
Theatres on the National Register of Historic Places in Indiana
Theatres completed in 1925
Buildings and structures in St. Joseph County, Indiana
National Register of Historic Places in St. Joseph County, Indiana
Demolished buildings and structures in Indiana
Buildings and structures demolished in 2005